Decade: Ten Years of Fierce Panda (released 1 March 2004) is a compilation album released by Fierce Panda Records. The album celebrates the label's tenth anniversary, and features some of their best-known artists.

Track listing
 Ash - "Punkboy"
 Supergrass - "Caught by the Fuzz"
 The Bluetones - "No. 11"
 Placebo - "Bruise Pristine"
 Kenickie - "Come Out 2nite"
 3 Colours Red - "This Is My Hollywood"
 Embrace - "All You Good Good People"
 Lo-Fidelity Allstars - "Diamonds Are Forever"
 Idlewild - "Chandelier"
 Seafood - "Porchlight"
 Coldplay - "Brothers & Sisters"
 Hundred Reasons - "Cerebra"
 Bright Eyes - "Arienette"
 Easyworld - "Hundredweight"
 The Music - "Take the Long Road and Walk It"
 The Polyphonic Spree - "Soldier Girl"
 Winnebago Deal - "Manhunt"
 Six by Seven - "Bochum (Light Up My Life)"
 Death Cab for Cutie - "Tiny Vessels"
 Keane - "This Is the Last Time"

References

Record label compilation albums
2004 compilation albums
Fierce Panda Records albums